Hypsipyla is a genus of snout moths. It was described by Émile Louis Ragonot in 1888.

Species
 Hypsipyla albipartalis (Hampson, 1910)
 Hypsipyla debilis Caradja & Meyrick, 1933
 Hypsipyla dorsimacula (Schaus, 1913)
 Hypsipyla elachistalis Hampson, 1903
 Hypsipyla ereboneura Meyrick, 1939
 Hypsipyla ferrealis (Hampson, 1929)
 Hypsipyla fluviatella Schaus, 1913
 Hypsipyla grandella (Zeller, 1848)
 Hypsipyla robusta (Moore, 1886)
 Hypsipyla rotundipex Hampson, 1903
 Hypsipyla swezeyi Tams, 1935

References

Phycitini
Taxa named by Émile Louis Ragonot
Pyralidae genera